Hongisto is a surname. Notable people with the surname include:

Reijo Hongisto (born 1962), Finnish policeman and politician
Richard Hongisto (1936–2004), American businessman, politician, sheriff, and police chief
Visa Hongisto (born 1987), Finnish sprinter